The Springfield Street Railway (SSR) was an interurban streetcar and bus system operating in Springfield, Massachusetts as well as surrounding communities with connections in Agawam, Blandford, Chicopee, East Longmeadow, Longmeadow, Ludlow, Monson, Palmer, Russell, Ware, Westfield, and West Springfield. With the first modern streetcars appearing in 1891, by 1905 the system had more miles of electrified track than New York City with its fledgling subway.

Today the former headquarters of the Springfield Street Railway Company serves as the maintenance facilities of Peter Pan Bus Lines, known colloquially as the Trolley Barn. Following prolonged negotiations, in 1981 the company, its property, and employee payroll at that time, were acquired and merged with the Pioneer Valley Transit Authority, into what is now known as its Springfield Area Transit Company (SATCo) division.

References

Further reading
 

1870 establishments in Massachusetts
1981 disestablishments in Massachusetts
Defunct Massachusetts railroads
Streetcars in Massachusetts
Bus companies of the United States
Companies based in Springfield, Massachusetts
Railway lines opened in 1870
Bus transportation in Massachusetts
Transport companies disestablished in 1981
Interurban railways in Massachusetts
Transportation companies based in Massachusetts
Transportation in Springfield, Massachusetts